T. V. Santhosh (born 1968 in Kerala) is an Indian artist based in Mumbai. He obtained his graduate degree in painting from Santiniketan and master's degree in Sculpture from M.S. University, Baroda. Santhosh has acquired a major presence in the Indian and International art scene over the last decade with several successful shows with international galleries and museums. His earlier works tackle global issues of war and terrorism and its representation and manipulation by politics and the media. Santhosh's sculptural installation "Houndingdown" was exhibited in Frank Cohen collection ‘Passage to India’. Some of his prominent museum shows are ‘Aftershock’ at Sainsbury Centre, Contemporary Art Norwich, England in 2007 and ’Continuity and Transformation’ show promoted by Provincia di Milano, Italy. He lives and works in Mumbai.

Early life and education 
Santhosh was born in 1968 at Trichur in Kerala, India. He started studying painting from 1989, starting at the Institute of Fine Arts in Trichur. Later at (1994 B.F.A in Sculpture) Kalabhavan, Santiniketan, West Bengal. He had completed his M.F.A(1997) in Sculpture at Faculty of Fine Arts, Maharaja Sayajirao University of Baroda.

Museum shows 
His major shows include the following:
 2012 WAR ZONE: Indian Contemporary Art, ARTEMONS CONTEMPORARY, Das Kunst museum, Austria.
 2012   Critical Mass: Contemporary Art from India, curated by Tami Katz-Freiman and Rotem Ruff, Tel Aviv Museum of Art, Israel   
 2012   Havana Biennale 
 2012   INDIA- LADO A LADO curated by Tereza de Arruda, SESC Belenzinho Sao Paula, Brazil 
 2011   INDIA, curated by Pieter Tjabbes and Tereza de Arruda, Centro CulturalBanco do Brasil in Rio de Janeiro, Brazil
 2011   4th Moscow Biennale of Contemporary Art “Rewriting Worlds”, curated by Peter Weibel
 2011   In Transition New Art from India, Surrey Museum of Art, Canada
 2011   Collectors’ Stage: Asian Contemporary Art from Private Collections, Singapore Art Museum, Singapore.
 2011   Crossroads India Escalate, Prague Biennale 5, 2011.
 2010   The Silk Road, New Chinese, Indian and Middle Eastern Art from The Saatchi Gallery at Tri Postal, Lille, France.
 2010   Empire Strikes Back, Saatchi Gallery, London.
 2009–11 Vancouver Biennale
 2009   Dark Materials curated by David Thorp, G S K Contemporary show, at Royal Academy of Arts, London.
 2009   India Xianzai, MOCA, Shanghai, China.
 2009   Passage to India, Part II: New Indian Art from the Frank Cohen Collection, at Initial Access, Wolverhampton, UK
 2008   Passage to India, Part I: New Indian Art from the Frank Cohen Collection, at Initial Access, Wolverhampton, UK
 2008   Where in the World, Devi Art Foundation, Delhi
 2007   Continuity and Transformation, Museum show, exhibition promoted by Provincia di Milano Italy.
 2007   After Shock, curated by Yasmin Canvin in collaboration with Sainsbury Centre Museum, Norwich
 2007   Lekha and Anupam Poddar Collection, New Delhi. 
 2004   Zoom!, Art in Contemporary India, Curated by Nancy Adajania & Luis Serpa, Culturegest Lisbon.
 2003   Crossing generations: diVERGE, curated by Geeta Kapur & Chaitanya Sambrani, presented by Chemould Gallery, NGMA Mumbai.
 2003 NGMA Annual Show, NGMA Mumbai.

Solo exhibitions 
 2011 The Land, Solo Show, Nature Morte, Berlin in collaboration with The Guild Art Gallery, Mumbai.
 2010    Burning Flags Solo Show, Aicon Gallery, London in collaboration with The Guild, Mumbai.
 2009–10 Blood and Spit. Solo Show, Jackshainman Gallery in collaboration with The Guild.
 2009    Living with a Wound, Solo Show, Grosvenor Vadehra, London in collaboration with The Guild.
 2008    A Room to Pray at Avanthay Contemporary, Zurich, in collaboration with The Guild, Mumbai.
 2008    Countdown, Nature Morte Delhi, in collaboration with The Guild Art Gallery Mumbai.
 2006    Scars of an Ancient Error, Singapore Art Fair presented by The Guild Art Gallery Mumbai.
 2005    False Promises, Grosvenor Gallery London, in collaboration with The Guild Art Gallery Mumbai.
 2004    Unresolved Stories, Nature Morte Delhi, in collaboration with The Guild Art Gallery Mumbai.
 2003    One Hand Clapping/Siren, Jehangir Art Gallery Mumbai presented by The Guild Art Gallery Mumbai.
 1997    At Faculty of Fine Arts Gallery, MSU, Baroda.

Key works 
"The work titled, Houndingdown is a key installation that broadly reflects my conceptual and linguistic concerns of my recent engagements. It consists of thirty dogs and LED panels, is a combination of few historical references of ruthless and unforgivable deeds men committed in the past and relentless angst about the thoughts of future. One of the references is a testimony, a text that runs across on three LED panels placed on the floor, of a schoolgirl who witnessed the Hiroshima nuclear explosion. This re-edited first hand description of such a dreadful vision of terror and screams is almost like a hounding dream yet more real than real that sends a chill down through the spine. It is a story of burned and mutilated dead bodies, how a familiar neighborhood suddenly turns into a ruined war zone and how the radiation turns a young girl into looking like old aged. The redness of the LED text plays the role of the image by reflecting it on to the images of dogs thus playing a crucial role in building up the totality of the installation." T. V. Santhosh.

Living with a Wound, 2009“The wounds …At that time I did not understand what was happening with all of us. But then the future was dark and memories pained us more, nothing seemed to be making any sense except we knew that there was no way out. From time to time some civilians, maybe drug manufacturers, came to visit me. Without any reason, they made a cut in my arm above the palm 10 centimetres long and 2 centimetres wide. Today I understand that the surgery that was done on me without anaesthesia and was done purposely with tools that weren't sterilised to cause infection. At times they kept exchanging the bandages with different medicated creams and liquids. The bandage was not wrapped around the arm but only covered the wound. Every day they examined the cut and each time the cut was about to heal, they reopened it and started the whole thing from the beginning. Alternate days a civilian would come to check the charts, made some remarks and gave orders. A part of the experiment was also to observe my ability to work with the wound and how far I could bear its pain. Slowly, as hopelessness started encroaching the pain, one day, Oh God! I heard someone screaming that war is over! And saw the soldiers there to rescue us from this hell…"  text on the LED Panel of the sculpture, Living with a Wound, 2009

Living with a Wound II"The text in this sculpture was taken from a testimony of a holocaust victim who was part of the Nazi medical experiments. They were treating humans like mere guinea pigs. My reference here is to an experiment they conducted to see how long a man can continue to live, enduring the pain of a wound on his body. The Nazis would make a cut on the hand with un- sterilised tools, then cover it for some days and then open it up again and again on a regular basis each times just before it is about to heal so as to keep it a living wound." – T. V. Santhosh.

Effigies of Turbulent Yesterdays,2011–2013“The genre of the landscape can be understood, among other things, as a product of the encounter between the pastoral imagination and the aspirations of an emergent landed gentry, whose relationship to their property is often the ostensible subject matter of the paintings. Apart from whatever aesthetic qualities that these works might have, they allude to a history of dispossession of jointly held resources, – largely through the private enclosure of open fields that had been farmed collectively by the peasantry over centuries, – a history that  remains invisible in the paintings themselves.  In a similar way, the equestrian portrait can be seen as a figuration of power. Its relative rarity is perhaps the result of generic conventions that tied it to an essentially commemorative purpose, but coupled with the fact that in the history of portraiture it is the powerful who have until recently had the privilege of being represented, one can see that it functioned almost exclusively in the service of ruling elite in establishing and extending their authority over their subjects. In painting, the equestrian figure is also implicated in conquest, as he traverses a landscape that he metaphorically colonises or administers and which became (or was) his fiefdom, acquired and maintained more often than not through the exercise of illegitimate power.

These iconographic conventions are here stood on their head (or lack thereof). In ‘Effigies of Turbulent Yesterdays’ we have a clash of different linguistic registers, with the powerful mimetic realism of the equestrian portrait meeting head on the schematised fountain of blood that springs from it, whose sources one can trace to miniature painting as well as comic book illustration. If the King is the Head of the State, then a decapitated monument is both a ludicrous and pitiful spectacle, – an act of iconoclasm which, like all forms of subversion attempts not to destroy it, but to turn it into an inverted representation of itself, or in this case, into an anti-monument that lays bare the disavowed histories of violence that sustain it, and by extension all such iconographies of power. The King famously has two bodies, a physical one that will eventually be subject to infirmity and death, and a symbolic one which metonymically stands in for the body politic and which continues to extend its dominion, by coercion or consent through the accoutrements of power. This act of symbolic regicide thus exemplifies the truth of every iconoclastic gesture, – the recognition that every contestation of power starts with the destruction of the images through which its authority continues to be exercised and reproduced,  – and thereby indicates the limits of sovereign power.- Sathyanand Mohan.

Scholarships and awards 
 2010    Padmini Award, Kerala Lalit Kala Academy
 1997    Kerala Lalit Kala Academy State Award
 1997    Inlaks Foundation (Indian)
 1997    National Scholarship
 1997    Kanoria Scholarship
 1994    Ramkinker Award
 1990–94 Visva Bharati Merit Scholarship

Art market 
Many of his works have featured in Christie's and Sotheby's over the past decade. T. V. Santhosh is represented by The Guild.

Collection 
Major European and Indian Collections.

Selected bibliography 
 Indian Art Fair New Delhi 2012.
 Indian Art Fair New Delhi 2011.
 The Land 2011. Berlin: Nature Morte April.(exhibition catalogue)
 Sinha, Gayatri. Voices Of Change: Indian Artists. Mumbai: 2011. The Marg Foundation.
 The Empire Strikes Back:Indian Art Today. 2010. London:The Saatchi Gallery.
 Inside India Italy: Luce Gallery 2010: 16,17,68,69. (Exh. Cat.)
 Merali, Shaheen. The 11th Hour: An Exhibition of Contemporary Art from India/ Diaspora. Beijing: Tang Contemporary Arts Centre.
 In Transition: New Art India. 2010. Canada: Richmond Art Gallery.
 Vancouver Biennale. 2009–2011: 80,81.
 Merali, Shaheen, and  Brigitte Ulmer, Alexander Keefe,Santhosh S. T.V.Santhosh:Blood And Spit. 2009. Mumbai:The Guild, New York:Shainman Gallery.
 Conor and Anne Macklin. Living With A Wound. London: Grosvenor Vadehra 2009.(exh. Cat.)
 Signs Taken for Wonders:Recent Art from India and Pakistan. London: Aicon Gallery,2008. (don't know if they had a catalogue)
 Where in the World. 2008. New Delhi: Devi Art Foundation
 Nair, Manoj. Affair. Dubai: 1x1 Gallery 2008. (curated by Bose) (dialogue with M.N.)
 A Room to Pray. Zurich: Avanthay Contemporary 2008.(in collaboration with The Guild) (exh. Cat.)
 Mehta, Anupa. India 20-Conversations with Contemporary Artists. 2007 Vadodara:Mapin/Alekhya Foundation.
 Seema Bawa. Does Size Matter ||? 2007. Mumbai: Studio Confluence. (Exh. Cat.) (curated by Bhavna Kakar)
 Cavin, Yasmin. After Shock. 2007. Norwich:Sainsbury Centre Museum: 68,69. (exh. Cat.)
 Adajania, Nancy, and Baiju Parthan. Unresolved Stories. 2004–2007. Mumbai: The Guild.
 Fleetwood, Anne, and Conor Macklin. False Promises. 2005. London: Grosvenor Gallery. (exh. Cat.) (in collaboration with The Guild)
 change of Address. 2005. India:The Guild (exh. Cat.)
 Paths of Progression. 2005. Mumbai:Saffronart.
 Ways of Seeing. 2005. New Delhi: Art Alive. (exh. Cat.)
 Jumaey, Zehra. Generation i. 2005. Mumbai:Saffronart and Mumbai:The Guild. (exh. Cat.)
 Bombay Boys. 2004. New Delhi. Palette Art Gallery. (not sure if catalogue was done).
 Ernst W.Koelnsperger. The Dual Path of Indian Art Today Part  | – || 2003 – 2004.
 Hoskote, Ranjit. Transfigurations at the Margin of Blur: Recent Paintings by T.V. Santhosh. 2003. Mumbai:The Guild.
 Hoskote, Ranjit. One Hand Clapping/Siren. 2003. Mumbai: The Guild. (exh. Cat.)
 Jakimowloz, Marta. X. 2003. Bangalore: Sakshi Gallery. (exh. Cat.)
 Kapur, Geeta, and Chaitanya Sambrani. Crossing Generations:Diverge. 2003. Mumbai:Jehangir Art Gallery.
 Shahane, Girish. Words and Images. 2002. Mumbai: The Guild. (exh. Cat.)
 Adajania, Nancy. Debt. 2002. Mumbai: The Guild. (exh. Cat.)
 Shahane, Girish. The Human Factor. 2001. Mumbai: The Guild. (exh. Cat.)
 Shahane, Girish. Engendering-Images of Women. 2001. Mumbai: The Guild. (exh. Cat.)

Notes
1. 
2. 
3. 
4. 
5. 
6. 
7. 
8. 
9. 
10. 
11. 
12. 
13. 
14. Flashartonline. https://web.archive.org/web/20120423120303/http://www.flashartonline.com/interno.php?pagina=articolo_det&id_art=826&det=ok&title=T.V.-SANTHOSH

References

Sources
 Merali, Shaheen, and Brigitte Ulmer, Alexander Keefe,Santhosh S. T.V.Santhosh:Blood And Spit. 2009.Mumbai:The Guild,New York:Shainman Gallery.  http://guildindia.com/T.V.Santhosh-BookRelease-Bloodandspit.htm .
 Adajania, Nancy, and Baiju Parthan. Unresolved Stories. 2004–2007. Mumbai: The Guild. http://guildindia.com/TVSANTHOSH-BookRelease.htm 
 Jackshainman Gallery http://www.jackshainman.com/publication11.html

External links 
 Grosvenor Gallery 
 The Guild 
 Saatchi Gallery 
 The Guild 
 Jackshainman Gallery 
 The Guild 
 YouTube 
 The Guild 
 The Guild 
 The Guild 
 The Guild 
 The Guild 
 Art Radar /
 Saffronart "TV Santhosh Profile,Interview and Artworks"
 Further information and images from the Saatchi Gallery
 Initial Access 

Painters from Kerala
1968 births
Living people
Visva-Bharati University alumni
Indian contemporary painters
Indian male painters
20th-century Indian painters